Mount Evans is a summit in Jasper National Park, Alberta, Canada.

Mount Evans was named by G.E. Howard in 1914 after Admiral Edward R. G. R. Evans, an Antarctic explorer.

References

Mountains of Jasper National Park
Three-thousanders of Alberta
Alberta's Rockies